The Credo in E minor (RV 591) is the only extant setting of the Nicene Creed by Antonio Vivaldi. Another setting exists (RV 592) but is of dubious authenticity.

Settings

RV 591 

RV 591 has four movements. In a style similar to his psalm setting of In exitu Israel (RV 604), the first movement adorns the chorus' simple rhythms of crotchets and minims with the orchestra playing semiquavers and quavers. The fourth movement is based on a semiquaver-quaver motif similar to the first movement, and closes with a fugue. 

The first (and final) movements open with a motif which bears similarity to a brief passage found in the first movement of the Gloria (RV 588).

Movements 

Credo in unum Deum
Et incarnatus est
Crucifixus
Et Resurrexit

Media

RV 592 

RV 592 is a disputed composition, attributed to Johann Adolph Hasse.

Editions 
 Vivaldi: Credo RV 591, Stuttgart Carus-Verlag 1974

External links 

Compositions by Antonio Vivaldi
Choral compositions
Nicene Creed